The 2011 Brickyard 400 presented by BigMachineRecords.com, the 18th running of the event, was a NASCAR Sprint Cup Series stock car race  held on July 31, 2011 at Indianapolis Motor Speedway in Indianapolis, Indiana. Contested over 160 laps on the 2.5-mile (4.0 km) asphalt rectangular oval, it was the 20th race of the 2011 Sprint Cup Series season.

There were five cautions and 22 lead changes among 13 different drivers throughout the course of the race. Paul Menard won his only Cup Series race, driving for Richard Childress Racing, while Jeff Gordon finished second, and Regan Smith clinched third. The result moved Menard to the 14th position in the Drivers' Championship. He remained 53 points behind tenth place driver Dale Earnhardt Jr. and two ahead of Kasey Kahne in fifteenth. Chevrolet maintained its lead in the Manufacturers' Championship, 20 points ahead of Ford and 28 ahead of Toyota, with 16 races remaining in the season. A total of 138,000 people attended the race, while 6.4 million watched it live on television.

Report

Background

Indianapolis Motor Speedway is one of six superspeedways to hold NASCAR races, the others being Michigan International Speedway, Auto Club Speedway, Daytona International Speedway, Pocono Raceway and Talladega Superspeedway. The track's turns are banked at 9 degrees, while the front stretch, the location of the finish line, has no banking. The back stretch, opposite of the front, also has none. The racetrack has seats for 250,000 spectators.

Before the race, Carl Edwards led the Drivers' Championship with 652 points, and Jimmie Johnson stood in second with 645. Kurt Busch was third in the Drivers' Championship with 641 points, four ahead of Kevin Harvick and nine ahead of Kyle Busch in fourth and fifth. Matt Kenseth with 626 was 39 ahead of Jeff Gordon, as Ryan Newman with 586 points, was nine ahead of Dale Earnhardt Jr., and 16 in front of Denny Hamlin. In the Manufacturers' Championship, Chevrolet was leading with 127 points, 17 ahead of Ford. Toyota, with 105 points, was 29 points ahead of Dodge in the battle for third. Jamie McMurray was the defending winner of the race.

Practice and qualifying

Three practice sessions were held before the race; the first two on Friday, both lasting 75 minutes. The third practice session was held on Saturday, and lasted 90 minutes. Kenseth was quickest with a time of 49.668 seconds in the first session, around seven thousandths of a second faster than second place Kasey Kahne. Hamlin followed in third place ahead of Edwards, David Ragan, and Kurt Busch. Juan Pablo Montoya was seventh, still within a second of Kenseth's time.

In the second practice session, Greg Biffle was fastest with a time of 50.474 seconds, less than four-hundredths of a second quicker than second-placed Martin Truex Jr. Johnson took third place, ahead of Casey Mears, Harvick and Edwards. Kenseth was only quick enough for the 29th position. Also during the second session, Hamlin's engine failed, prompting the session to halt with three minutes remaining. In the third and final practice, Biffle remained quickest with a time of 49.297 seconds. Kahne followed in second, ahead of Kurt Busch and Ragan. Edwards was fifth quickest, with a time of 49.583 seconds. Montoya, A. J. Allmendinger, Kenseth, Brian Vickers, and Johnson rounded out the first ten positions.

Forty-eight drivers were entered for qualifying, but only forty-three could qualify for the race because of NASCAR's qualifying procedure. Ragan clinched the second pole position of his career, with a time of 49.182 seconds. He was joined on the front row of the grid by Kahne. Johnson qualified third, Kurt Busch took fourth, and Brad Keselowski started fifth. Allmendinger, Montoya, Gordon, Kenseth and Edwards rounded out the top ten. The five drivers who failed to qualify for the race were David Stremme, Travis Kvapil, Erik Darnell, J. J. Yeley, and Scott Wimmer. Following the conclusion of the session, Ragan commented, "We're working as hard as we ever have. It's finally just showing. We've always had a lot of confidence in our team. The last couple years we've really underperformed. That has not been a secret."

Race

The race, the 20th in the season, began at 1:00 pm EDT and was televised live in the United States on ESPN. Representative Howard Brammer began pre-race ceremonies, by giving the invocation. Next, Rascal Flatts performed the national anthem, and Mari Hulman George gave the command for drivers to start their engines.

Ragan retained his pole position lead into the first corner, followed by Kahne, who started second. Kahne managed to take first before the conclusion of the first lap. Two laps later, Allmendinger moved up to third. On the sixth lap of the race, Trevor Bayne was forced to go to the pit lane after overheating. After starting eighth on the grid, Gordon had moved up to fourth, as Kurt Busch fell to seventh. By the 11th lap of the race, Kahne had extended his lead to three seconds over Ragan. Three laps later, Gordon moved into the second position. By lap 17, Kahne had extended his lead to 4.5 seconds. On the 22nd lap, Kenseth passed Allmendinger for fourth. After 25 laps, Allmendinger and Kahne made pit stops, two laps before Kurt Busch. Everyone had made pit stops by the 30th lap of the race, which moved Kahne back into first.

Four laps later, the first caution was given because of debris on the racing surface. Most of the front runners made pit stops, except Kahne and Gordon. At the restart on the 38th lap, Kahne was the leader ahead of Gordon and Johnson. By the 42nd lap, Gordon had passed Kahne and expanded his lead to 1.3 seconds. On the following lap, Hamlin moved up to fifth, as Kenseth took over seventh. On lap 45, Earnhardt Jr. made a pit stops to remove grass from his front grille. Five laps later, the second caution was given after David Reutimann collided into the wall. All of the front runners made pit stops during the caution, as Earnhardt Jr. became the leader. On the 57th lap, Kenseth and Johnson passed Kyle Busch for fourth and fifth place respectively. On the following lap, Gordon moved up to second after overtaking Ragan. Gordon passed Earnhardt Jr. to become the leader on the 60th lap.

Four laps later, Kahne moved up to fourth. On lap 68, Johnson passed teammate Earnhardt Jr. to take second. On the 72nd lap, Jamie McMurray made a pit stop for some adjustments. On the next lap, Keselowski made a pit stop, three laps before Tony Stewart. While making a pit stop, Stewart had to do a pass through penalty for going faster than the proposed speed on pit road. After everyone made pit stops, Gordon reclaimed the lead on lap 84. Ten laps later, debris on the track prompted the third caution. Most of the leaders made pit stops during the caution. At the restart on lap 97, Paul Menard was the leader, ahead of Kenseth and Ragan. On the 101st lap, Kahne took sixth from Hamlin, as Menard remained the leader. Six laps later, Kenseth passed Menard to become the leader. On the 108th lap, Montoya moved up to third, as Johnson moved up to 11th. On lap 114, the fourth caution was given after Kyle Busch collided into the wall. Most of the front runners made pit stops during the caution, while Keselowski did not.

At the restart on lap 117, Keselowski was the leader. On the following lap, Montoya moved up to third, as Marcos Ambrose received a drive-through penalty after switching lanes before the start, finish line. On the 120th lap, Landon Cassill spun sideways, prompting the fifth caution to be given. None of the front runners made pit stops during the caution. Keselowski continued to lead on the lap 126 restart, as Clint Bowyer moved into second. On the 130th lap, Jeff Burton made a pit stop, as Gordon overtook Kenseth for fourth. On the following lap, Johnson made a pit stop, one lap before Keselowski, Montoya and Kahne. At lap 133, Earnhardt Jr. and Joey Logano made a pit stop, a lap before Bowyer, and two laps before Gordon. Afterwards, Ragan made a pit stop, moving Stewart into first. By lap 140, Stewart had a four-second lead over second placed Brian Vickers.

Six laps later, Stewart made a pit stop for fuel, moving Menard into first. With ten laps remaining, Trevor Bayne moved up to tenth, three laps before McMurray became the leader as Menard was saving fuel. By the 155th lap, Gordon had moved up to fifth, as the drivers in front of him were at a slower pace from trying to get better fuel mileage. With three laps remaining, Menard reclaimed first from McMurray, as Gordon moved up to third. On the final lap, Gordon moved into second, and Menard crossed the finish line first to score his first Sprint Cup Series victory. Gordon was second, ahead of Regan Smith, McMurray, and Kenseth.

Post-race

Menard appeared in victory lane after his victory lap to start celebrating his first win of his career, in front of a crowd of 138,000 people. Jeff Gordon said of Menard's first victory: "I went and saw him. His eyes, he's like a deer in headlights. I'm so happy for him. It's one thing to get your first win here, but it's another when you can appreciate how special it is to win here. I think Paul certainly has that."

Although Stewart was leading the race near the end, he had to pit for fuel. Stewart, who finished sixth, said, "I'm really happy for Paul Menard. Paul's been around this place for a long time, been here since he was a kid. It couldn't have happened to a better guy. It's a pretty deserving win right there. I'm happy for him." In the subsequent press conference, Gordon stated his happiness for Menard by saying, "Just because he's been here so much as a kid experiencing Indy, he knows how special it is to compete here, let alone win here. So I think the feelings are probably very similar. He probably has a greater appreciation for it than I did in '94, because while I was watching from a distance and my heroes were Indy 500 drivers, I wasn't in the garage like he was."

Smith also commented, "I just know what it means to Paul. I know how hard he's worked. He always talks about coming up here. He always talks about how much he loves this place. I know if he had to highlight one race to get his first win, I'm sure he'd tell you in a minute he couldn't be happier. You only get one chance to get your first win. It's a special thing, especially when you do it here." The race result moved Menard up five positions to 14th in the Driver's Championship with 553 points, 53 points behind tenth. Edwards, who finished fourteenth in the race, remained first in the standings, as Johnson followed in second. Harvick followed in third ahead of Kyle Busch and Kenseth. Chevrolet maintained their lead in the Manufacturers' Championship with 136 points. Ford and Toyota placed second and third with 116 and 108 points, while Dodge was fourth with 80. 6.4 million people watched the event live on television. The race took two hours, fifty minutes and thirty seconds to complete, and the margin of victory was 0.725 seconds,

Results

Qualifying

Race results

Standings after the race

Drivers' Championship standings

Manufacturers' Championship standings

Note: Only the top five positions are included for the driver standings.

References

Brickyard 400
Brickyard 400
NASCAR races at Indianapolis Motor Speedway
July 2011 sports events in the United States